Sadhu bhasha was a historical literary register of the Bengali language most prominently used in the 19th to 20th centuries during the Bengali Renaissance. Sadhu-bhasha was used only in writing, unlike Cholito-bhasa, the colloquial form of the language, which was used in both writing and speaking. These two literary forms are examples of diglossia. Sadhu-bhasha was practised in official documents and legal papers during the colonial period; however, it is mostly obsolete in the present day.

History
This Sanskritised form of Bengali is notable for its variations in verb forms and the vocabulary which is mainly composed of Sanskrit or tatsama words. It was mainly a vocabulary making it easier for literary works in Sanskrit to be translated. Notable among them was Iswar Chandra Vidyasagar, who standardised the Bengali alphabet and paved the path for literary works. The colloquial usage of Bengali consisted mostly of its Prakrit base as well as indigenous (deshi), Persian and Arabic words embedded into the vocabulary. As a result, the Brahmins, a Hindu pundit caste, chose the path of Sanskritisation to make a "pure" language which would be used as a representative of classical languages into which the works of Sanskrit and Hindu literature can be translated. This shifted Bengali from its original Prakrit roots towards Sanskrit. This in turn increased the commonality in Bengali vocabulary with other Indo-Aryan languages, such as Hindi.

By the time of Rabindranath Tagore, the Sadhu-ness ("purity") of the literary form had largely waned into just a set of Sanskrit verb forms and in a decade, Tagore himself would switch to writing in Cholito Bhasha. Dr. Radha Nag's book Atmaghati Nirad Choudhuri আত্মঘাতী নীরদ চৌধুরী (Suicidal Nirad Choudhuri) appears as the last Bengali book written in Sadhu Bhasha.

Bangladeshi writer, intellectual, academic Dr. Salimullah Khan has been writing in Sadhu Basha since 2005.

Famous newspaper Anandabazar Patrika uses Sadhu Bhasha on their editorial column, partially, even today.

Styles
The mid-19th century hosted two influential writers of Sadhu-bhasha; Ishwar Chandra Vidyasagar and Bankim Chandra Chattopadhyay. Vidyasagar's style was very conservative towards withholding only the use of tatsama (Sanskrit) when writing. His style came to be known as Vidyasagari and Akshay Kumar Datta also wrote in this style. Chatterjee's writing style was somewhat more lenient to the use of tadbhava and deshi vocabulary. It came to be known as Bankimi – a more popular style, it was practised by the likes of Rabindranath Tagore, Hara Prasad Shastri, Dinesh Chandra Sen, Mir Mosharraf Hossain and Ismail Hossain Siraji.

Sample text
The following is a sample text in Sadhu-Bhasha of Article 1 of the Universal Declaration of Human Rights:

Bengali in the Bengali alphabet

Bengali in phonetic Romanization

Dhara êk: Sômôstô manush shadhinbhabe sôman môrjada ebông ôdhikar lôiya jônmôgrôhôṇ kôre. Tãhader bibek ebông buddhi achhe; sutôrang sôkôleri êke ôpôrer prôti bhratrittôsulôbh mônobhab lôiya achôrôṇ kôra uchit.

Bengali in the International Phonetic Alphabet

Gloss

Clause 1: All human free-manner-in equal dignity and right taken birth-take do. Their reason and intelligence exist; therefore everyone-indeed one another's towards brotherhood-ly mind-spirit taken conduct do should.

Translation

Article 1: All human beings are born free and equal in dignity and rights. They possess conscience and reason. Therefore, everyone should act in a spirit of brotherhood towards each other.

The following is a sample text in Cholit-Bhasha of Article 1 of the Universal Declaration of Human Rights:

Bengali in the Bengali alphabet

Bengali in phonetic Romanization

Dhara êk: Sôb manush shadhinbhabe sôman môrjada ar ôdhikar niye jônme. Tãder bibek ar buddhi achhe; sutôrang sôkôleri êke ôpôrer prôti bhratrittôsulôbh mônobhab niye achôrôn kôra uchit.

Bengali in the International Phonetic Alphabet

Gloss

Clause 1: All human free-manner-in equal dignity and right taken bear. Their reason and intelligence exist; so everyone-indeed one another's direction-to brother’s like mind’s spirit taken conduct do should.

Translation

Article 1: All human beings are born free and equal in dignity and rights. They possess conscience and reason. Therefore, everyone should act in a spirit of brotherhood towards each other.

See also
 Bengali poetry
 Alaler Gharer Dulal

References

External links

Bengali dialects